Hostotipaquillo   is a town and municipality, in Jalisco in central-western Mexico. The municipality covers an area of 697.94 km².

As of 2005, the municipality had a total population of 8,228.

Government

Municipal presidents

References

Municipalities of Jalisco